This is a list of earthquakes in 1929. Only magnitude 6.0 or greater earthquakes appear on the list. Lower magnitude events are included if they have caused death, injury or damage. Events which occurred in remote areas will be excluded from the list as they wouldn't have generated significant media interest. All dates are listed according to UTC time. Several large events occurred this year with the main focus of the activity being in Alaska with 4 magnitude 7.0 + events. The deadliest earthquake struck Turkmenistan in May with 3,800 of the years 3,972 deaths in this event. A rare earthquake struck the north Atlantic Ocean in November with the deaths of 28 in Canada being caused by a tsunami. Dutch East Indies was notably quiet this year.

Overall

By death toll 

 Note: At least 10 casualties

By magnitude 

 Note: At least 7.0 magnitude

Notable events

January

February

March

April

May

June

July

August

September

October

November

December

References

1929
 
1929